Foort van Oosten  (born 25 June 1977 in Dordrecht) is a Dutch politician and lawyer. As a member of the People's Party for Freedom and Democracy (Volkspartij voor Vrijheid en Democratie), he was a member of the House of Representatives between 20 September 2012 and 20 February 2019. On 20 February 2019 he was appointed as mayor of Nissewaard.

Previously, he was a member of the municipal council of Schiedam from 2010 to 2011, and subsequently an alderman of this municipality from 2011 to 2012.

Van Oosten studied law at Leiden University. He is married, and has a son.

In February 2020, he lobbied for a national knife ban following a spate of stabbings involving teenagers.

In September 2020, Nissewaard councilor Peter van der Velden filed a complaint against the municipality and mayor Foort van Oosten for raiding his home in Spijkenisse without permission. Officials of the civil affairs department, at the behest of Van Oosten, started an investigation on suspicions that Van der Velder did not live within the municipality and therefore may not be a councilor there.

References 

1977 births
Living people
21st-century Dutch lawyers
Leiden University alumni
Mayors in South Holland
Members of the House of Representatives (Netherlands)
Municipal councillors in South Holland
People from Dordrecht
People from Schiedam
People's Party for Freedom and Democracy politicians
21st-century Dutch politicians